The Beau Brummels were an American rock band that formed in 1964 and originally consisted of singer Sal Valentino, lead guitarist Ron Elliott, bassist Ron Meagher, rhythm guitarist Declan Mulligan and drummer John Petersen. Local radio disc jockeys Tom Donahue and Bobby Mitchell discovered the band at a club near San Francisco. 
They signed the Beau Brummels to their fledgling Autumn Records label, and their house producer, Sylvester Stewart, later known as Sly Stone, recorded the band's early sessions.

The group's first single, "Laugh, Laugh", was released in December 1964 and peaked at number 15 on the United States Billboard Hot 100 chart in February 1965. 
It was their highest-charting single in Canada, where it reached number two.
The band's debut album, Introducing the Beau Brummels, followed in April and peaked at number 24 on the U.S. Billboard 200 chart. The album featured "Laugh, Laugh" and the band's second single, "Just a Little", which reached the top ten in the U.S., Canada,
and Australia. 
In August, the band released their second album, The Beau Brummels, Volume 2, which failed to chart. "You Tell Me Why" was their third consecutive top-ten single in Canada,
and it reached the U.S. top 40.

The Autumn label was sold in early 1966 to Warner Bros. Records, which then persuaded the band to record a covers album titled Beau Brummels '66. Released in July, the album was considered a disappointment by critics and failed to chart. The band worked with producer Lenny Waronker for their next album, the critically acclaimed Triangle (1967),
which was followed in 1968 by Bradley's Barn, one of the earliest country rock albums. By 1969 the Beau Brummels had been reduced to a duo consisting of Valentino and Elliott, and they decided to part ways to pursue solo projects and participate on recordings with other artists.

The five original Beau Brummels reformed in 1974 and resumed touring. 
A performance recorded in February near Sacramento, California, was released in 2000 as the Live! album. In April 1975 the band released an eponymous album, which reached number 180 on the Billboard 200 chart. 
The group split up soon after the album's release, but the Beau Brummels continued to perform live in various incarnations from the late 1970s to the early 2000s. 
Fourteen compilation albums featuring the band's music have been released, including two box sets: San Fran Sessions (1996), which contains 60 demos, outtakes, rarities and unissued performances recorded from 1964 to 1966; 
and Magic Hollow (2005), which collects 113 singles, album tracks, demos and previously unreleased material.

Albums

Studio albums

Live album

Compilation albums

Singles

Other appearances

References

External links
 Sundazed: The Beau Brummels
 
 

Discography
Discographies of American artists
Rock music group discographies